Super Black Blues is an album by the Super Black Blues Band featuring Otis Spann, Joe Turner and T-Bone Walker recorded in Los Angeles in 1969 and originally released by the BluesTime label.

Reception

AllMusic reviewer Stephen Thomas Erlewine stated "The emphasis on improvisation and long grooves certainly made Super Black Blues different than the original '40s and '50s sides by Walker, Turner, and Spann -- those were restricted by technology and taste -- and it's fun to hear them stretch out ... This does mean Super Black Blues is a bit dated and a bit of an anomaly in the catalogs of Walker, Spann, and Turner, but time has turned this into an amiable detour: not the first record to hear by any of these three by any means, but it's fun to hear the giants find common ground".

Track listing
All compositions by T-Bone Walker except where noted
 "Paris Blues" − 14:03
 "Here Am I Broken Hearted" (Buddy DeSylva, Lew Brown, Ray Henderson) − 3:47	Amazon	
 "Jot's Blues" − 8:15
 "Blues Jam" − 10:59

Personnel
T-Bone Walker − vocals, guitar
Joe Turner − vocals
Otis Spann − vocals, piano
Ernie Watts − tenor saxophone
George "Harmonica" Smith − harmonica
Arthur Wright − guitar
Ron Brown − bass
Paul Humphrey – drums

References

1969 albums
Otis Spann albums
T-Bone Walker albums
Big Joe Turner albums
Albums produced by Bob Thiele
Flying Dutchman Records albums